The 2008–09 Yeovil Town F.C. season was Yeovil Town's 6th season in the Football League and their fourth consecutive season in League One, finishing in 17th position with 51 points.

Transfers

In

Out

Loan in

Loan out

Match results

League One

League table

FA Cup

League Cup

Football League Trophy

Squad statistics
Source:

Numbers in parentheses denote appearances as substitute.
Players with squad numbers struck through and marked  left the club during the playing season.
Players with names in italics and marked * were on loan from another club for the whole of their season with Yeovil.
Players listed with no appearances have been in the matchday squad but only as unused substitutes.
Key to positions: GK – Goalkeeper; DF – Defender; MF – Midfielder; FW – Forward

See also
 2008–09 in English football
 List of Yeovil Town F.C. seasons

Notes

References

English football clubs 2008–09 season
2008–09
Yeovil Town